This is a list of ski areas and resorts in Iran. This list contains 25 ski resorts.

Tehran Province

Darbandsar Ski Resort
Tochal
Abali
Shemshak

Alborz Province
Dizin
Khor Ski Resort

Ardabil Province
Alvares
Fandoqlu Grass Skiing Resort

Markazi Province
Shazand Ski Resort

Fars Province
Tarbiatbadani Fars Ski Resort
Pooladkaf

West Azerbaijan Province
Khoshaku

East Azerbaijan Province
Sahand Ski Resort
Yam Ski Resort

Kurdistan Province
Nassar Ski Resort
Saqqez Ski Resort

Chaharmahal and Bakhtiari Province
Kuhrang (Chelgerd) Ski Resort

Kohgiluyeh and Boyer-Ahmad Province
Kakan

Hamedan Province
Tarik-darreh

Semnan Province
Shahmirzad Ski Resort

Razavi Khorasan Province
Shirbad

Isfahan Province
Fereydunshahr Ski Resort

Qazvin Province
Kamaan

Zanjan Province
Papaei Ski Resort

See also
List of ski areas and resorts in Asia

External links
Directory of Ski resorts in Iran
Ski of Persia - Iranian Ski Resort Guide

Sport in Iran